Castelcivita (Cilentan: A Castellucce) is a town and comune in the province of Salerno in the Campania region of south-western Italy.

Geography
The town is situated in the middle of Cilento, by the western side of the Alburni mountains, and its territory is part of the Cilento and Vallo di Diano National Park. Neighboring municipalities are Albanella, Altavilla Silentina, Aquara, Controne (the nearest town), Ottati, Postiglione, Roccadaspide and Sicignano degli Alburni. The municipalities counts the hamlets (frazioni) of Cosentini, Pantano-Serracchio and Serra.

Main sights

See also
Cilento
Cilentan dialect

References

External links

 Official  website 
 Official site of the caves
 Castelcivita genealogy compilation

Cities and towns in Campania
Localities of Cilento